Marine Scout Bombing Squadron 243 (VMSB-243) was a dive bomber squadron in the United States Marine Corps.  The squadron, also known as the “Flying Goldbricks”, fought in World War II during the Battle of Bougainville and later in the Philippines campaign (1944–45).  They were deactivated shortly after the end of the war on  September 25, 1945.

History
VMSB-243 was commissioned at Marine Corps Air Station Santa Barbara on June 1, 1942.  On January 18, 1943 the squadron departed San Diego for Marine Corps Air Station Ewa, Hawaii.  Upon arrival at Ewa they were split into two echelons with one going to Johnston Atoll and the other to Palmyra Atoll.  The squadron remained split until September 1943  when they returned to MCAS Ewa.

On October 26, 1943 the squadron departed for the South Pacific,  The flying echelon of the squadron was based out of Munda (Solomon Islands) while the ground echelon was based at Efate.  From here they attacked Ballale, Kahili and Kara in support of the Bougainville Campaign.  In December 1943 the flight echelon joined the ground echelon on Efate where they remained until March 1944.

In June 1944 the squadron moved to Emirau.  The squadron remained here until the end of the year when they began moving for the Philippines to take part in the campaign to retake the country.  The squadron fought through the entire campaign as part of Marine Aircraft Group 32 and later MAGSZAM.

The squadron ended World War II in the Philippines and deployed back to MCAS Santa Barbara in September 1945 and were decommissioned shortly after that.

Unit awards
A unit citation or commendation is an award bestowed upon an organization for the action cited. Members of the unit who participated in said actions are allowed to wear on their uniforms the awarded unit citation. VMSB-243 has been presented with the following awards:

See also

 United States Marine Corps Aviation
 List of active United States Marine Corps aircraft squadrons
 List of decommissioned United States Marine Corps aircraft squadrons

Notes

References
Bibliography

 

Web

 VMSB243.com

SBD
Inactive units of the United States Marine Corps